The PCD World Tour was the first concert tour by American girl group, The Pussycat Dolls, launched in promotion of their debut album, PCD (2005). During the tour, the group also toured North America with Christina Aguilera and The Black Eyed Peas. The group caused controversy during their show at the Sunway Lagoon theme park, breaking Malaysian decency laws.

Setlist
"Buttons"
"Beep"
"I Don't Need a Man"
"Fever" 
"Dance Sequence" 
"Feelin' Good" 
"Stickwitu"
"How Many Times, How Many Lies"
"Tainted Love"
"Hot Stuff (I Want You Back)"
"Bite the Dust"
"Dance Sequence" 
"Wait a Minute"
Encore
"Sway"
"Whole Lotta Love"
"Don't Cha"

Broadcasts and recordings
On February 4, 2007, The Pussycat Dolls' concert at the Manchester Evening News Arena was recorded and streamed online via MSN. The same concert was broadcast on DirectTV through May and June.

Tour dates

Box office score data

References

The Pussycat Dolls concert tours
2006 concert tours
2007 concert tours